Traylor is a surname. Notable people with the surname include:

 Austin Traylor (born 1993), American football player
 Bill Traylor (1853–1949), American artist
 Chet D. Traylor (born 1945), American jurist
 Craig Lamar Traylor (born 1989), American actor
 David Traylor (born 1943), English cricketer
 John H. Traylor (1839–1925), American politician, developer and mayor of Dallas 1917-1919
 Keith Traylor (born 1969), American football nose tackle
 Melvin Alvah Traylor (1878–1934), American lawyer and banker
 Melvin Alvah Traylor, Jr. (1915–2008), American ornithologist
 Morton Traylor (1918–1996), American fine artist, designer and serigrapher
 Ray Traylor (1963–2004), American wrestler
 Robert Traylor (1977–2011), American basketball player
 Steve Traylor (born 1951), American college baseball coach
 William Traylor (1930–1989), American actor and acting coach

See also
 Traylor Howard